Liza Manili is a French actress and singer, born in 1986 in Strasbourg. At 16 she began modeling before turning to films.  She signed with EMI's record label in 2011.  Her first album, produced by Séverin and Julien Delfaud, was released on 4 June 2012.  The album was recorded in Paris at Studio Gang, the legendary studio of Michel Berger.

Filmography

Discography 
 2009: Appeared on Séverin's album Cheesecake, song Les restes
 2010: Docteur Tom (musical), song Le Verdict
 2011: Christopher Williams / Non Non / Le Petit Train (EP)
 2012: L'Eclipse (single)
 2012: Liza Manili (début album)

References

External links 
 Official Website
 

Musicians from Strasbourg
1986 births
Living people
French film actresses
21st-century French actresses
French television actresses
21st-century French singers
21st-century French women singers
Actors from Strasbourg